Moonshine Kate (born Rosa Lee Carson, October 10, 1909, Atlanta, Georgia - 1992, Bainbridge, Georgia) was an American country and folk guitarist and banjo player who is best known for recording with her father Fiddlin' John Carson and his band, the Virginia Reelers. Kate was among the earliest recorded women in country music, and arguably her best remembered song was a rendition of her father's composition "Little Mary Phagan".

Carson was born the youngest of nine children in Atlanta, Georgia. As early as the age of five, she appeared as a vocalist and dancer at stage shows and political rallies as an accompaniment to her father's musical act. By age 14, Carson proficiently performed with the guitar and banjo as she played alongside her father on Atlanta's flagship radio station, WSB, and toured with him and the Virginia Reelers throughout Georgia. When Carson graduated from high school, she became a permanent member of the band.

In June 1925, Carson made her recording debut accompanying her father on guitar on four sides for OKeh Records. In the same session, she also recorded two solo efforts, "The Lonely Child", which was about a lonely wandering orphan, and "Little Mary Phagan". The somber ballad was composed by Fiddlin' Jon Carson in 1915, as a response to the notorious, and highly publicized murder of 13-year-old Mary Phagan, which was allegedly perpetrated by her manager, Leo Frank. She played and recorded with the Virginia Reelers until 1934, adopting the stage name Moonshine Kate in 1928 at the suggestion of Okeh Records man Polk Brockman. Many of Kate's recordings for Okeh play up her name, consisting of short musical passages interspersed with quick-witted dialogues revolving around the moonshine trade.

The Great Depression ended the Carsons' recording days, and she continued to perform intermittently, also working with Eugene Talmadge on his 1932 bid for Governor of Georgia and for the Atlanta Department of Recreation. She married in 1944 and retired in Georgia. In 1983, both she and her father were inducted into the Atlanta Country Music Hall of Fame.

References

[ Moonshine Kate] at Allmusic
Moonshine Kate at the New Georgia Encyclopedia

American women country singers
American country singer-songwriters
1992 deaths
1909 births
American country banjoists
Old-time musicians
20th-century American singers
20th-century American women singers
Country musicians from Georgia (U.S. state)
Singer-songwriters from Georgia (U.S. state)